Gerald Moultrie was a Victorian public schoolmaster and Anglican hymnographer born on 16 September 1829 in Rugby Rectory, Warwickshire, England. He died on 25 April 1885 in Southleigh, England, aged 55.

Biography
His father, John Moultrie was also a hymn writer. He was educated at Rugby School and Exeter College, Oxford.  He received his BA in 1851 and his MA in 1856 from Oxford. Taking Holy Orders, he held a number of positions. He became Third Master and Chaplain in Shrewsbury School; Chaplain to the Dowager Marchioness of Londonderry (1855–59); Curate of Brightwalton (1859); and of Brinfield, Berkshire (1860); Chaplain of the Donative of Barrow Gurney, Bristol (1864); Vicar of Southleigh (1869); and Warden of St. James’ College, Southleigh (1873). He wrote multiple hymns, along with some hymn translations, including Let All Mortal Flesh Keep Silence. He published several hymn books among which the Cantica Sanctorum (1850), Hymns and Lyrics for the Seasons and Saints’ Days of the Church (1867).
He died on 25 April 1885 in Southleigh, England, aged 55.

Work
Moultrie's published works include:
 Cantica Sanctorum, or Hymns for the Black Letter Saints Days in the English and Scottish Calendars, 1850
 The Primer Set Forth at Large for the Use of the Faithful, 1864
 Hymns from the Post Reformation Editions, 1864
 The Devout Communicant, 1867
 Hymns and Lyrics for the Seasons and Saints’ Days of the Church, 1867
 The Espousals of S. Dorothea and Other Verses, 1870
 Six Years’ Work in Southleigh, 1875

Hymns

Moultrie composed hymns of traditional Christian piety based on devotion to Mary the mother of Jesus, the Angelic Hosts and the Communion of Saints at the Eschaton in the vein of High Church reverence for the transcendent prevalent in the celebration of liturgy in his time. A sampling includes
 A Tale of the olden Time
 Bishop of the Souls of Men
 Come, Faithul People
 Jesus, Tender Shepherd
 Lo, the Sacrifice Atoning
 Marriage Feast Is Ready, The
 Mary, Maiden Undefiled
 Mother, from Whose Bosom's Veil
 There Is a Sound of Rejoicing Around the Great Throne
 Virgin Born the King of Heaven
 We march to victory

The lyrics for which he is most renowned are his translation from the Greek of the Offertory chant of the Cherubic Hymn taken from the  4th century AD Byzantine Divine Liturgy of St. James, popularly known by the first line of the first verse "Let All Mortal Flesh Keep Silence" arranged by Ralph Vaughan Williams to the tune Picardy.

See also
 Liturgy of St. James 
 Liturgy of Saint James (Transcription)
 Picardy (hymn) 
 Oxford Movement

References

External links
 Center for Church Music Gerard Moultrie
 Preview image of "Let All Mortal Flesh Keep Silence" from Gather Comprehensive, a Roman Catholic hymnal published by online by GIA Hymnprint.Net

1829 births
1885 deaths
Church of England hymnwriters
19th-century English poets
English male poets
19th-century English male writers
People from Rugby, Warwickshire
People educated at Rugby School
Alumni of Exeter College, Oxford